Manila Calling is a 1942 American black-and-white World War II propaganda war film drama from 20th Century Fox, produced by Sol M. Wurtzel, directed by Herbert I. Leeds, that stars Lloyd Nolan, Carole Landis, Cornel Wilde, James Gleason, Lester Matthews, Louis Jean Heydt, and Ted North.

The film's storyline concerns American civil engineering forces struggling to establish an operational radio base following the invasion of the Philippines, with Japanese army forces resisting, and with the complication of the arrival in their midst of a beautiful nightclub singer fleeing the Japanese.

Production
According to United Press, "less than 12 hours" after the start of the attack on Pearl Harbor, John Larkin "was banging on the door of 20th Century-Fox with a scenario entitled 'Secret Agent in Japan.' He made one of the quickest sales in the history of the movies".

Plot
After the Japanese army invades the Philippines, they capture the radio station owned by the American Radio Communications Company. The staff is forced to escape. and they head into the jungle, where they eventually meet up with a band of determined Filipino Scouts, known as Moros. Together, they cut their way through the dense jungle, finally making their way to the coast.

The ARCC staff, made up of radio technician Jeff Bailey (Cornel Wilde) and communications men Lucky Matthews (Lloyd Nolan) and Tom O'Rourke (James Gleason), find an advance Japanese force occupying the plantation of an old friend. Working with the Moros as a guerrilla unit, they attack and kill the Japanese, seizing the plantation for its available radio transmitter.

Solidifying their defense positions, the group quickly discovers there is no food or water and that the plantation is now largely surrounded by elements of the Japanese army. A night club singer, Edna Fraser (Carole Landis), also escaping from the Japanese, has made it safely to the plantation as well. Jeff is working to repair the damaged radio set in order to send messages of hope and courage to the conquered Filipinos. His hope is to rally the populace against Japanese enslavement and exploitation by joining the Philippine resistance.

The Japanese quickly become aware of this possibility and, using all means at their disposal, launch a determined land and air campaign to find and destroy the radio transmitter. Jeff is killed, and the plantation comes under heavy bombardment from the air.

As the bombs fall, Lucky is able to transmit a series of patriotic messages to the Filipino people under the repeated call sign "Manila Calling, Manila Calling". He demands continued resistance, at all costs, to the Japanese invaders from everyone hearing the broadcast. He encourages unwavering belief that all 130 million Americans are behind them and that they have not abandoned the islands and its people but are working even now toward their liberation. As the bombs continue to fall, destroying the plantation buildings one by one, Lucky states in no uncertain terms that General MacArthur will make good on his pledge to return and free the Philippines and its people. He then pleads, "America, send us the tanks and the guns, and we'll finish the job. Manila calling, Manila calling, Manila calling"...

Cast

 Lloyd Nolan as Lucky Matthews
 Carole Landis as Edna Fraser
 Cornel Wilde as Jeff Bailey
 James Gleason as Tim O'Rourke
 Lester Matthews as Wayne Ralston
 Louis Jean Heydt as Harold Watson
 Ted North as Walter Jamison
 Martin Kosleck as Heller
 Ralph Byrd as Corbett
 Charles Tannen as Fillmore
 Elisha Cook Jr. as Gillman
 Harold Huber as Santoro
 Victor Sen Yung as Armando
 Uncredited actors: Rudy Robles as a Moro warrior, 
Richard Loo, and Leonard Strong

Reception

Review by T.S., New York Times, September 28, 1942

"Probably no one will be permanently deafened by 'Manila Calling,' now at the Globe. Assuredly, war is accompanied by a great deal of noise, and in that respect the producer, Sol Wurtzel, has gone all-out for realism. With all the enthusiasm of a youngster on the Fourth of July, he has filled his film with loud reports, concussions, flame and explosion. Machine guns chatter violently and at length. Actors grow hoarse shouting at each other above the uproar. If Mr. Wurtzel's tribute to the guerrillas of the Philippines could be measured by decibels alone, he would have a triumph. But drama, even in a disastrous inferno, sometimes has a still, small voice. In 'Manila Calling' it would been a hard time making itself heard".

"As a man who keeps up with the headlines, Mr. Wurtzel has seized upon the idea of using the Japanese invasion of the Philippines as the background for a story similar to that of 'Lost Patrol.' A small band of fighting men seize a commanding height and after being augmented by several assorted civilians hold the position until their ranks are thinned out, one by one, and the last survivors blasted from the rock by bombers—the last two being Mr. Lloyd Nolan, a hard-bitten fellow, and Miss Carole Landis, erstwhile Ping Girl, who pops into the story without reasonable cause. Together they broadcast a brave message to the world before they are wiped out".

"But neither the authors nor the director have capitalized on a sound dramatic device. They have simply made use of the clichés which require (a) that one man go berserk from the strain, (b) that one man try to escape at the expense of the others, and (c) that the tight-lipped hero has a heartbreaking story locked in his memory somewhere. From time to time Mr. Nolan does succeed in creating a credible hero, but for the most part the characters are hackneyed in writing and performance. As an action film of the more rudimentary kind, 'Manila Calling' is continuously noisy. "...considering the subject and the times, that hardly seems enough".

("Ping Girl", period Hollywood slang/sexual innuendo, adapted from a car motor oil ad: "The Ping Girl: She really makes you purr".)

Home video
Manila Calling is currently available as a manufacture on demand DVD from 20th Century Fox Cinema Archives.

References

External links 
 
 Turner Classic Movies page
 

1942 films
1942 war films
American war films
Films directed by Herbert I. Leeds
20th Century Fox films
World War II films made in wartime
Films set in Manila
Pacific War films
Films set in the Philippines
American black-and-white films
1940s English-language films